was a Japanese actor and voice actor who was represented by 81 Produce. Tsujimura died on November 27, 2018.

Filmography

Television animation
Andersen Stories (1971) - Satyr, Hans
Paris no Isabelle (1979) - Leon
Galaxy Express 999 (1979) - Great Chief
Dragon Ball (1987) - Village Headman
Dragon Ball Z (1995) - Dai Kaiōshin
Berserk (1997) - Foss
One Piece (1999–present) - Banban
Negima (2005) - Konoemon "Dean" Konoe
Dragon Ball Kai (2015) - Dai Kaiōshin

Original video animation (OVA)
Leda: The Fantastic Adventure of Yohko (1985) – Chizamu
Legend of the Galactic Heroes (1991) - Eugen Richter

Film Animation
Arabian naito: Shindobaddo no bôken (1962) - Yasim
Golgo 13 (1973) - Eghbali
Nausicaä of the Valley of the Wind (1984) - King Jihl
Patlabor: The Movie (1989) - Jitsuyama
Porco Rosso (1992)
Slayers: The Motion Picture (1995) - The King

Videogames
Arc the Lad (1995) - Gogen
Arc the Lad II (1996) - Gogen
Virtua Fighter 4 (2001) - Shun Di
Shenmue II (2001) - Jianmin Tao
Kingdom Hearts II (2005) -Gopher
Virtua Fighter 5 (2006) - Shun Di
Everybody's Golf 6 (2011) - Langundo

Tokusatsu
Marude Dameo (1966-1967, Television Drama) - Borot
Ultra Seven (1967-1968) - Alien Vira / Alien Pega
Kamen Rider (1971-1973) - Mantis / Dokugander Larva-Imago / Musasabeedle / Namekujira / Kamestone / Dokumondo / / Isoginjaguar / Kumolion / Canarycobra / Namekujikinoko / Hiruchameleon
Kamen Rider vs. Shocker (1972) - Zanjioh
Ultraman Ace (1972) - Ultraman / Alien Orion
Henshin Ninja Arashi (1972-1973) - Obakekurage / Dotem / Gremlin
Kamen Rider V3 (1973) - Machinegun Snake / Lens Ant / Missile Gecko / Guillotine Dinosaur / Cockroach Spike / Murderous Dokugahra / Zombie Bat
Kamen Rider X (1974) - Hydra / Okaltos / Genghis Khan-Condor / Starfish Hitler
Five Riders vs. Kin Dark (1974) - Franken Bat
Kamen Rider Amazon (1974-1975) - Beastman Centipede / Toad Beastman / Salamander Beastman
Kamen Rider Stronger (1975) - Kikkaijin Gangaru / Kumo Kikkaijin / Kikkaijin Kemunga / Dokugaran / Dead Lion / Commander Black
Kamen Rider (Skyrider) (1979) - Cobranjin / Aokabijin 
Kamen Rider Super-1 (1980-1981) - Mukaderiya / Keyman Joe
Ninja Sentai Kakuranger (1994) - Kasha
Denji Sentai Megaranger (1997) - Owl Nejire
Seijuu Sentai Gingaman (1998) - Wangawanga
Seijû sentai Gingaman vs Megaranger (1999) - Wangawanga

Live-action films
Shiawase wa oira no negai (1957) - Newspaper deliverer
Farewell to Space Battleship Yamato (1978) - Kotetsu Serizawa / Andromeda Captain
Tampopo (1985)
A Taxing Woman (1987) - Kikuchi

Television dramas
Playgirl (1970–1974)
Dokuganryū Masamune (1987)

Dubbing

Live-Action
12 Angry Men (Juror #2 (John Fiedler))
Bubble Boy (Pappy/Pippy (Patrick Cranshaw))
Creepshow 2 (Ben Whitemoon (Frank Salsedo))
Police Story (Chu Tao (Chor Yuen))
Twin Peaks (Major Garland Briggs (Don S. Davis), The Man From Another Place (Michael J. Anderson))

Animation
The Adventures of Tintin (Professor Calculus)
Alice in Wonderland (Broom Dog (TBS edition))
Disney's House of Mouse (Gopher)
Chip 'n Dale: Rescue Rangers (Professor Norton Nimnul)
Inspector Gadget (Chief Quimby)
Lady and the Tramp (Beaver)
Pinocchio (The Coachman)
ReBoot (Phong)
The Rescuers Down Under (Krebs)
Voltron (King Alfor)

Japanese voice-over
Pinocchio's Daring Journey (The Coachman)
Pooh's Hunny Hunt (Gopher)

Others
Borot in Marude Dameo 
Phone in Mighty Jack 
Ambassador in Fight! Mighty Jack 
Soviet spokesman in Latitude Zero 
Shimozawa lieutenant in Kaiki Daisakusen 
Alien Puma in Silver Mask 
Babayan in Chibira-Kun 
ObakeJellyfish, Dotem, Gremlin in Henshin Ninja Arashi 
Invader (41-42, 49) in Mirrorman 
Yokosuka base PS1 in Japan Sinks
Alien Meteor (Voice : Osamu Saka, Ritsuo Sawa) in Fireman
Dora Danugi in Bouken Rockbat
Mezalord in Akumaizer 3 
Baron Tsuchigumo in Battle Hawk 
Cycle Man, Tokerunger in Space Ironman Kyodain 
Lieutenant Waizeru, Major Enubaru, Lieutenant Colonel Seed in Enban Sensō Bankid
Bat Man, Fang Wild boar, Haedobuler, Kanibabura, Buffalo Guu in The Kagestar 
Moezo, Amanojaki, Rebirth Noppera-bō, Rebirth Gamaganma, Rebirth Kanedama in Choujin Bibyun

References

External links
 Official profile 
 

Japanese male video game actors
Japanese male voice actors
Male voice actors from Tokyo
1930 births
2018 deaths
81 Produce voice actors